The Fiat 500 Moretti Coupe is a rear-engine, two-seat, rear wheel drive coupé based on the chassis and engine of the Fiat 500, produced by the Moretti Motor Company from 1961 to 1969.

History 
The Fiat 500 Moretti Coupe started as a prototype first displayed in the 1960 Turin Auto Show, before starting hand-built production the following year, in 1961. The production model featured a longer and less curved roof line, as well as a flatter front fascia with a near-right angle at the front of the hood. Both versions were designed by Giovanni Michelotti.

In 1965, the Moretti 500 coupe switched from being built off of the chassis of the 500 D, to the chassis of the 500 F.

A higher-end variant was added in 1966, known as the 595 SS. This version had its engine upgraded and tuned to make 28 hp, which changed the original top speed of 115 km/h (71 mph) to 130 km/h (81 mph). Other changes within this variant included extra gauges on the dashboard (a tachometer and an oil pressure gauge), as well as a modified exhaust system.

References 

Fiat